Phyllosticta capitalensis is a cosmopolitan fungal plant pathogen that grows on many hosts either as an endophyte or as a saprobe on dead tissue, including species of Citrus and Musa (bananas). There are some reports of it infecting orchids, such as cattleyas or Cymbidium.

References

External links
 USDA ARS Fungal Database

Fungal plant pathogens and diseases
Orchid diseases
capitalensis
Fungi described in 1908